The Goshen News is a six-day, Monday through Saturday daily newspaper serving Goshen, Indiana, and adjacent portions of Elkhart, Kosciosko, Noble, LaGrange and Marshall Counties in Indiana. The paper publishes Monday through Friday with a Saturday Weekend edition. It is owned by Community Newspaper Holdings Inc., a subsidiary of Raycom.

History 
The Goshen News has been in print since 1954.

Joseph A. Beane created the Goshen Daily Democrat in 1897, and it remained in print until 1933. The Goshen Democrat was a weekly edition of the paper that served rural subscribers. The Goshen Daily Democrat competed with George W. Kinnison's paper, the Goshen-News Times for several decades before they merged into the Goshen Daily News-Times and Democrat in 1933. The paper was owned by Kinnison and D.L. Barndhart under the News Print Co. The paper's name was shortened to the News-Democrat in 1936. The News-Democrat was renamed Goshen News in 1954. The paper was owned by Kinnison's relatives until 1999 when the family sold News Print Co. to Gray Communications Systems Inc., based out of Atlanta, Georgia. Community Newspaper Holdings Inc. bought the paper in 2006.

References

External links 
 
 CNHI Website

Newspapers published in Indiana
Elkhart County, Indiana
Companies based in Elkhart County, Indiana
Newspapers established in 1837
1837 establishments in Indiana

References